Armenia fielded two competitors at the 2009 World Championships in Athletics in Berlin. Both athletes also competed at the 2008 Olympic Games.

Team selection

Track and road events

Field and combined events

Results

Men

Women

References

External links
Official competition website

Nations at the 2009 World Championships in Athletics
World Championships in Athletics
2009